Tinctoporellus is a genus of fungi in the family Polyporaceae. Species in the genus produce crust-like fruit bodies with pore-containing surfaces. The type species, T. epimiltinus, grows on the wood of angiosperms and is widespread in distribution. Tinctoporellus was circumscribed by Norwegian mycologist Leif Ryvarden in 1979. He suggested that Antrodia was closely related based on morphological similarities.

The Brazilian species Tinctoporellus isabellinus was added to the genus in 2003, while T. bubalinus and T. hinnuleus, found in China, were reported as new to science in 2012.

References

Polyporaceae
Polyporales genera
Taxa named by Leif Ryvarden
Fungi described in 1979